Comte Émile de Kératry (24 March 1832, Paris — 6 April 1904, Paris) was a French politician, soldier and author, the son of Auguste Hilarion (old noble Breton family).

Kératry became deputy for Finistère in 1869, and strongly supported the Franco-Prussian War in 1870. He was in Paris during part of the siege, but escaped in a balloon, and joined Léon Gambetta. He was appointed to raise an "army of Brittany" from the west of France to strike back at the advancing Prussians, but his hastily assembled volunteers were poorly equipped and suffered poor conditions while being prepared for combat at Camp Conlie. As a result, Kératry resigned.

In 1871 Thiers appointed him to the prefecture, first of the Haute-Garonne, and subsequently of the Bouches-du-Rhône, but he resigned in the following year.

Works
 La Contre-guérilla française au Mexique (1868)
 The Rise and Fall of the Emperor Maximilian (L'Élévation et la chute de l'empereur Maximilien) (1867)
 Le Quatre-septembre et le gouvernement de la défense nationale (1872)
 Mourad V, prince, sultan, prisonnier d'État 1840-78 (1878)

References

1832 births
1904 deaths
Politicians from Paris
Writers from Paris
French nobility
French people of Breton descent
Members of the 4th Corps législatif of the Second French Empire
Prefects of police of Paris
French male writers
French military personnel of the Franco-Prussian War